The 1971 Italian Open – Men's doubles was an event of the 1971 Italian Open tennis tournament and was played at the Foro Italico in Rome, Italy from 3 May through 10 May 1971. The draw comprised 24 teams, four of them were seeded. Ilie Năstase and Ion Ţiriac were the defending doubles champions but did not compete in this edition. First-seeded John Newcombe and  Tony Roche won the doubles title, defeating unseeded Andrés Gimeno and Roger Taylor in the final, 6–4, 6–4.

Seeds

Draw

Finals

Top half

Bottom half

References

External links
 ITF tournament edition details

1971 Italian Open (tennis)